Harvey Virdi is a British actress of Indian descent. She trained at Academy Drama School in London.

Career
Her theatre credits include The Borrowers (at the Sherman Theatre, Cardiff), Tiger Country and Tales From The Harrow Road (Hampstead Theatre), When We are Married, Twelfth Night (in 1997 and 2004,), Romeo and Juliet (in 2000,), Square Circle and Playboy of the Asian World (all at the Leicester Haymarket), Airport 2000 (Riverside Studios, Hammersmith), and Jatinder Verma's production of Exodus (Tara Arts/BAC). In 2003, she was 'Mrs Peachum' in a touring production of The Threepenny Opera for the Royal National Theatre. In 2004 she gave a critically acclaimed Maria in an Indian-themed production of Twelfth Night at the Albery Theatre. She also appeared as Nina Mandal, in Coronation Street. She was a supporting cast member in two seasons of Class Dismissed.

Her film credits include Bend It Like Beckham, Anita and Me, Thunderbirds, Bride and Prejudice, The Mistress of Spices, Honour, Jadoo, and Brick Lane. 
Television credits include  The Kumars at No. 42 (as the family's interfering landlady, 'Hawney'), Boohbah (as 'Mrs. Lady'), Doctors, Lucky Man (as 'Shefali Malhotra'), and Whose Baby?.
She has also appeared in various radio plays including in 2009, in "The Inheritance Of Loss By Kiran Desai".

As a writer, her credits include 'There's Something About Simmy', 'The Deranged Marriage', 'Miss Meena & the Masala Queens' 2017 RIFCO Arts, 'Happy Birthday Sunita', 2014 RIFCO Arts and 'Meri Christmas' 2006 RIFCO Arts.

She appeared in Citizen Khan as regular character 'Mrs Malik'.

In May 2017 it was announced Virdi had joined the cast of Channel 4 soap Hollyoaks playing Dr. Misbah Maalik. She departed on 1 June 2020, but this was soon confirmed as a temporary exit, with Virdi returning to the role on 21 September 2020.

Filmography

Awards and nominations

References

External links

British stage actresses
British film actresses
British soap opera actresses
Alumni of the Academy Drama School
British actresses of Indian descent
Actresses from Coventry
Living people
Year of birth missing (living people)